The Seamstress is a concerto for solo violin and orchestra by the British-born composer Anna Clyne.  The work was commissioned by the Chicago Symphony Orchestra, for which Clyne was then composer-in-residence.  It was first performed May 28, 2015 at Symphony Center, Chicago by the violinist Jennifer Koh and the Chicago Symphony Orchestra under conductor Ludovic Morlot.  The Seamstress marks the second collaboration between Clyne and Koh, who had previously premiered Clyne's double violin concerto Prince of Clouds in November 2012.

Composition
The Seamstress has a duration of roughly 25 minutes and is composed in one continuous movement.  Clyne described her inspiration for the piece in the score program notes, writing:
The title of the piece comes from the William Butler Yeats poem "A Coat".

Instrumentation
The work is scored for solo violin and an orchestra comprising two flutes, piccolo, two oboes, cor anglais, two clarinets, bass clarinet, two bassoons, contrabassoon, four horns, three trumpets, two trombones, tuba, timpani, three percussionists, a laptop, harp, and strings.

Reception
The Seamstress was met with a mixed response from critics.  Reviewing the world premiere, John von Rhein of the Chicago Tribune said the piece "turned out to be less of an event than one had expected" and wrote:
Lawrence A. Johnson of the Chicago Classical Review similarly criticized the "ill-judged electronic component" and a "rather anticlimactic" coda, but nevertheless added:

References

Compositions by Anna Clyne
2014 compositions
Violin concertos
Music commissioned by the Chicago Symphony Orchestra